Charles John Dickinson  (1792–1842) was an Anglican bishop in the Church of Ireland and Privy Councillor. Born in Cork in August 1792, he was the son of Charles Dickinson, a brazier, and educated at Trinity College, Dublin, where he obtained scientific and classical prizes, and was in 1813 elected scholar before being ordained in 1818. At Dublin he was close a friend of Charles Wolfe and Hercules Henry Graves (1794–1817), brother of Robert James Graves. His tutor, Thomas Meredith, "reckoned by many as the best lecturer and tutor of his time in college, was so impressed with the manly talents of his pupil (Dickinson), that he urged him to direct his thoughts to the Bar, as the certain road to speedy and high advancement". Nonetheless, he pursued a career in the church and his first post was at Castleknock after which he was Chaplain of the Dublin Female Orphan Home (Kirwan House). In 1832 he became Chaplain to the Archbishop of Dublin and the following year the incumbent at St. Ann's Church, Dawson Street. He became Bishop of Meath in 1840 and died in post on 12 July 1842.

References

1792 births
1842 deaths
Clergy from Cork (city)
Alumni of Trinity College Dublin
19th-century Anglican bishops in Ireland
Anglican bishops of Meath
Members of the Privy Council of Ireland